White Horse Lake is a lake located in Waterford Township, Michigan. It lies east of Hospital Rd., north of Elizabeth Lake Rd. and south of Pontiac Lake Rd.

The eight-acre lake is part of the Clinton River.

Fish
White Horse Lake fish include bluegill and panfish.

References

Lakes of Oakland County, Michigan
Lakes of Waterford Township, Michigan